Kot Abadan Halt railway station is located in Kot Abadan village, Toba Tek Singh district of Punjab province of the Pakistan.

See also
 List of railway stations in Pakistan
 Pakistan Railways

References

External links

Railway stations in Toba Tek Singh District
Railway stations on Khanewal–Wazirabad Line